The 2004–05 season was the Persepolis's 4th season in the Pro League, and their 22nd consecutive season in the top division of Iranian Football. They were also be competing in the Hazfi Cup. Persepolis was captained by Behrouz Rahbarifar.

Squad
As of October 2004.

Transfers

In

Out

Technical staff

|}

Competition record

Iran Pro League

Standings

Competitions

Iran Pro League

Hazfi Cup

Scorers

See also
 2004–05 Iran Pro League
 2004–05 Hazfi Cup

References

External links
Iran Premier League Statistics
RSSSF

Persepolis F.C. seasons
Persepolis